Daichi (also Romanized as Dā’īchī and Dāychī) is a village in Silakhor Rural District, Silakhor District, Dorud County, Lorestan Province, Iran. At the 2006 census, its population was 227, in 54 families.

References 

Towns and villages in Dorud County